The 2017 European Short Course Swimming Championships took place in Copenhagen, Denmark from 13 to 17 December 2017. The meet was held in the Royal Arena, which was finished in early 2017. It was the first major sports event in this arena, which has a capacity of circa 12,500.

It was the second time that Denmark hosted this event, after the 2013 edition in Herning.

Bidding process
Poland and Italy were also bidding to host the championships. The decision to select Copenhagen was announced by LEN President Paolo Barelli on 9 October 2015.

Medal summary

Medal table

Men's events

Legend: WR - World record; WBT - World best time; ER - European record; NR - National record; CR - Championship record; WJ - Junior world record

Women's events

Legend: WR - World record; WBT - World best time; ER - European record; NR - National record; CR - Championship record

Mixed events

References

External links
Official website
Results book

European Short Course Swimming Championships
2017 in swimming
2017 in Danish sport
Swimming competitions in Denmark
International aquatics competitions hosted by Denmark
International sports competitions in Copenhagen
December 2017 sports events in Europe
2017 in Copenhagen